Alexander Drake may refer to:

Alexander M. Drake (1859–1934), American pioneer
Alexander Wilson Drake (1843–1916), American artist